Valério Breda (24 January 1945 – 16 June 2020) was an Italian-born Brazilian Roman Catholic bishop.

Breda was born in Italy and was ordained to the priesthood in 1973. He served as bishop of the Roman Catholic Diocese of Penedo, Brazil, from 1997 until his death in 2020.

Notes

1945 births
2020 deaths
21st-century Roman Catholic bishops in Brazil
Italian Roman Catholic bishops in South America
20th-century Roman Catholic bishops in Brazil
Roman Catholic bishops of Penedo